The Faculty of Electronics, Technical University of Varna was created in 1990. It directs four departments: electronics and microelectronics, communications and communication technologies, telecommunication engineering and social and legal studies. Undergraduate and postgraduate courses are offered.

History 

In 1987, a rapid increase in the use of electronics and microelectronics by the general population suggested the need for increased research and development in this field in Bulgaria. In 1990, the Faculty of Electronics at the Technical University of Varna was established under the auspices of the Council of Ministers of the Republic of Bulgaria. The school's formation united the department of communication equipment and the department of radio. The new school was given the task of preparing specialists to work in the fields electronic design, modeling, and design of electronic equipment and systems.

In 2011, the structure of the Faculty changed to include departments of electronics and microeconomics, communication engineering, and social and legal science. The school offers bachelor, master and doctoral degrees. Students from Eastern Europe and Turkey are welcomed.

The deans of the Faculty have been:
 Elijah Petrishki (1990-1995)
 Dimitar Judah (1995-1999)
 Elijah Petrishki (1999-2003)
 Yordan Kolev (2003-2011)
 Vera Dimova (2011-)

Departments

Electronics and microelectronics 
This department was established in 1987, initially under the Faculty of Electronics and Automation. In 1989, it was renamed the Faculty of Electronics, engaging the services of teachers from other universities in the region. In 1991, twenty-five engineers graduated. Since 2015, the Faculty has added subjects in biomedical electronics to its program.

In 2012, a first laboratory of electronics was built. Since then, twelve laboratories have been set up including spaces for embedded systems, digital signal processing, medical electronics, electronics for renewable energy, aided design in electronics and microelectronics.

The heads of the Department have been:
 Dimitar Judah (1987-1993)
 Yordan Kolev (1993-2003)
 Hristo Gigov (2003-2012)
 Dimitar Kovachev (2012-)

Communications and communication technologies 

This department has followed on from the founding departments of radio and communications technology, originally part of the department of telecommunication equipment. It employs teachers and staff from a wide range of fields of study and from universities, institutes and government departments from Bulgaria and abroad. In 1972, two laboratories were created for the study of radio communication systems. In 1983, the department was renamed the department of radio and television equipment.

Telecommunication engineering 
This department, formed in 1963, is concerned with the study of subjects such as analog communication devices, transmission of signals, and equipment for communication systems. The first head of department, Vasil Halachev, became the first accredited professor of the University. The first graduates completed their degrees in 2004 and master's degrees followed.

The heads of the department have been:
 Vasil Halachev (1967-1976)
 Kiril Djurov (1976-1993)
 Iliya Atanasov (1993)

Social and legal studies  
In 1994, this department was formed to teach criminal and civil law, theory and history of state and law, administration and state legal sciences, journalism, education, translation and processing of scientific information.

Heads of the department have been:
 Nedelcho Kemanov (1992-1993)
 Ivan Lazarov (1993-1994)
 Vasil Mitkov (1995-1996)
 Nedelcho Kemanov (1997-2002)
 Rumiana Kurteva (2002-2007)

See also 
  Web page about the Department of Social and Legal Sciences in English.

Technical University of Varna
Buildings and structures of the Technical University of Varna